Juraj Sabol (born 4 December 1983) is a former football player from Slovakia and last manager of Liptovský Mikuláš.

Career
On 8 September 2015, he was appointed as a head coach of FK Senica. On May 26zh, 2016  he was sacked. As a coach of MFK Tatran Liptovský Mikuláš, he achieved the best place in club history, 4th in 2014–2015 Slovak Second Football League.

External links
 Futbalnet profile

References

1983 births
Living people
Slovak footballers
1. FC Tatran Prešov players
Slovak football managers
FK Senica managers
Association footballers not categorized by position